Claude Lamoral, 3rd Prince of Ligne, Prince of Epinoy, Marquis of Roubaix and Count of Fauquemberg (8 October 1618 – 21 December 1679), was a nobleman from the Spanish Netherlands, a soldier and diplomat in the service of  Philip IV of Spain and Charles II of Spain .

Biography
Born at Belœil, he succeeded his brother Albert Henry (1615–1641), as third Prince of Ligne. He married in 1642 his brother's widow Claire Marie of Nassau-Siegen, countess of Nassau (Brussels, October 1621 – Belœil, 2 September 1695). He was a Prince of the Holy Roman Empire, Grandee of Spain and Knight in the Order of the Golden Fleece (1646).  

Between 1649 and 1669, he was Captain General of the Spanish Cavalry in the Spanish Netherlands, which was the third highest military position after Captain General and Governor of the Arms.
 

In 1660, he was sent as representative of the Spanish King to the Royal court of Charles II of England as first foreign recognition of the newly restored English monarchy.

He became Viceroy of Sicily (1670–1674), where he fortified the coastal defences against Turkish pirates, who attacked the local population to abduct and sell them into slavery.

Later he was appointed Governor of the Duchy of Milan (1674–1678). 

Claude Lamoral, and after his death, his wife Claire Marie, enlarged the Chateau of Belœil and its spectacular French-styled 25 ha garden, which has a 6 ha. lake in front of the castle. Today the gardens are partially open to the public.

Children 
Their daughter Louise Claire de Ligne married on 1 April 1644 the Portuguese nobleman Raimundo de Lencastre, 4th marquess of  Torres Novas, 1st duke of Torres Novas, 4th duke of Aveiro, Conselheiro de Estado. In Spain he was also duke of Ciudad Real, a Grandee of Spain in May 1664, 8th Duke of Maqueda, marquess de Montemayor, marquess of Elche and many other lesser titles, deceased in Guadix on 6 October 1666, aged 35. He had to flee to Spain after the Portuguese Secession of 1640.

She married again the Spanish nobleman Iñigo Manuel Velez Ladrón de Guevara y Tassis, 10th count of  Oñate, a Grandee of Spain by king Philip IV of Spain to his ancestors in 1640 and a Knight of the Order of the Golden Fleece, Head of the Spanish Post Offices, deceased in 1699.

She had no issue, apparently, in the first marriage but issue on the second.

Ancestry

References

External links 
 Genealogy of the Belgian house de Ligne, in French

 

1618 births
1679 deaths
Viceroys of Sicily
Knights of the Golden Fleece
Spanish generals
03
03
Grandees of Spain